The Yellow Daisy Festival is an arts and crafts festival, held in Stone Mountain, Georgia.Sunshine Artist Magazine has voted the festival one of the top five arts and crafts shows in the nation.

History 
The Yellow Daisy Festival is named after the Confederate yellow daisy (Helianthus porteri). The festival began in 1968 and has become an annual celebration. It is held Thursday-Sunday following Labor Day. (USA). The Yellow Daisy Festival started out as a small event, but has since grown into a four-day event.

There was a virtual festival in 2020.

Attractions and entertainment 
Festival attendance is approximately 200,000 people. Vendors offer furniture, glass, games, food, paintings, jewelry, and sculptures.  For entertainment, there are live bands and DJs, most of whom play rock and roll and bluegrass.

References 

Festivals in Atlanta
Tourist attractions in DeKalb County, Georgia
1968 establishments in Georgia (U.S. state)
Annual events in Georgia (U.S. state)